Jamieson is a name of English origin. 

Jamieson may refer to:

Surname
 Alice Jamieson, Canadian feminist and magistrate
 Alix Jamieson (born 1942), Scottish long jumper (1964, Olympic Games)
 Andrew Jamieson (1849–1912), Scottish engineer and academic author
 Billy Jamieson, antique and curios dealer from Toronto
 Bob Jamieson, American television journalist
 Cathy Jamieson, member of the Scottish parliament
 Charlie Jamieson, American baseball player
 Colin Jamieson, Western Australian politician
 Craig Jamieson (Robert Craig Jamieson, born 1953), Cambridge academic
 David Auldjo Jamieson, Victoria Cross recipient
 David Jamieson (British politician), British politician
 David Jamieson (Canadian politician)
 Don Jamieson (politician), Canadian politician
 Don Jamieson (comedian)
 Douglas Jamieson, magistrate, Scottish unionist
 George W. Jamieson (1810-1868), American actor
 Henry Jamieson, English footballer
 Hugh Pierce Jamieson, American politician
 Iain Jamieson, Scottish footballer and businessman
 Ian R. Jamieson, a pseudonym of  Ron Goulart, writer
 James Jamieson (disambiguation), several people, including
James Jamieson (Australian doctor) (1840–1916), Scottish-born doctor, active in Australia
James Jamieson (dancer) (1920–1993), Highland dancer
James Jamieson (dentist) (1875–1966), Scottish dentist and author
James Jamieson (ice hockey) (1922–1985), hockey player
James Jamieson (New Zealand doctor) (1880–1963), Scottish-born doctor, active in New Zealand
James Edgar Jamieson (1873–1958), Ontario farmer and political figure
James D. Jamieson (born 1934), cell biologist
James P. Jamieson (1867–1941), Missouri architect
 Jane Jamieson, Australian athlete
 Janet Jamieson, All-American Girls Professional Baseball League player
 Jim Jamieson (1943–2018), U.S. golfer
 John Jamieson, Scottish lexicographer
 Kathleen Hall Jamieson, American professor of Communications and fact checker
 Kyle Jamieson, New Zealand cricketer
 Leah Jamieson, American electronics engineer and academic
 Margaret Jamieson, Scottish Labour politician
 Mathew Buchan Jamieson (1860–1895), Scottish civil engineer in British Guiana and Australia
 Michael Jamieson, (born 1988), Scottish swimmer
 Nina Moore Jamieson (1885–1932), Irish born Canadian teacher, journalist, poet and lecturer.
 Norma Jamieson, Tasmanian politician
 Penny Jamieson, Anglican bishop of Dunedin, New Zealand
 Peter Michael Jamieson, Scottish chess master
 Phil Jamieson, Australian rock musician with Grinspoon
 Reid Jamieson, Canadian singer songwriter
 Reuben Rupert Jamieson, mayor of Calgary, Alberta
 Robert Jamieson (disambiguation), several people, including
 Robert Jamieson (antiquary) (1772–1844), Scottish antiquary
 Robert Jamieson (merchant) (died 1861), London promoter of West African commerce
 Robert Jamieson (1802–1880), co-editor of the Jamieson-Fausset-Brown Bible Commentary
 Robert Jamieson (chess player) (born 1952), Australian chess player
 Robert Alan Jamieson (born 1958), Shetland dialect poet and novelist
 Robert Stuart Jamieson (1922–2006), musician, author, engineer, inventor, and patent agent
 Scott Jamieson, Australian footballer (soccer)
 Stuart Jamieson, New Brunswick, Canada politician
 Thomas Jamieson (1829–1913), Scottish geologist
 Thomas Hill Jamieson (1843–1876), Scottish librarian
 Tim Jamieson, American baseball coach
 William Allan Jamieson, (1839–1916) Scottish physician and academic author
 William Darius Jamieson, (1873–1949) newspaper publisher and Congressman from Iowa
 William Jamieson (Australian politician), (1861–1912) member of South Australian House of Assembly
 William Jamieson (mining) (1853–1926), Australian surveyor, co-founder of Broken Hill Proprietary mines
 Willie Jamieson (born 1963), Scottish footballer
 Willie Jamieson (curler), Scottish curler
 Yazmeen Jamieson (born 1998), Canadian-born footballer with Jamaica women's team

First name
 Jamieson Price

Miscellaneous
 Jamieson v HM Advocate, a Scottish legal case of 1994 relating to consent in rape cases
 Jamieson Wellness, a Canadian multinational pharmaceutical company

Places
 Jamieson, Oregon, an unincorporated community in Malheur County
 Jamieson, Victoria
 Jamieson Place, Edmonton, neighborhood in Canada

Schools
 Dr. Annie B. Jamieson Elementary School

See also
 Jamison
 Jameson
 James (disambiguation)
 James (surname)

Patronymic surnames
Surnames from given names